Phillip Docker (8 April 1886 – 29 October 1978) was an Australian cricketer. He played two first-class matches for New South Wales in 1910/11.

See also
 List of New South Wales representative cricketers

References

External links
 

1886 births
1978 deaths
Australian cricketers
New South Wales cricketers
Cricketers from Sydney